Prestini is an Italian surname. Notable people with the surname include:

James Prestini (1908–1993), American sculptor, designer, and woodworker
Leno Prestini (1906–1963), American painter and sculptor 
Paola Prestini (born 1975), Italian composer 

Italian-language surnames